Alva Earl Campbell Jr. (April 30, 1948 – March 3, 2018) was an American murderer from Ohio at the Chillicothe Correctional Institution in Chillicothe, Ohio. He was convicted of the 1997 murder of 18-year-old Charles Dials in Franklin County.

Background
Born in 1948, one of six siblings, he suffered an abusive home life. Between 1959-65, he was placed in “two different residential treatment facilities in Pennsylvania, nine separate detention  center placements [and] two different foster homes." His father was committed to the Lima State Hospital for raping one of Campbell's sisters. Campbell's mother was complicit in prostituting Campbell's sisters in exchange for money and alcohol when the girls were teenagers, and one of Campbell's sisters became pregnant at age 15, Stebbins described. Campbell and his sisters were finally removed from their mother's care after the children entered a bar and begged for food.

Campbell's earliest recorded offenses, according to the Ohio Department of Rehabilitation and Correction, were three counts of armed robbery, one of grand larceny, and one of shooting with the intent to kill. All of the charges originated in three different counties. He was sentenced to an unspecified amount of prison time in June 1968, aged 20. He was convicted of the murder of an adult male in the course of a robbery in November 1972. He was regarded by Franklin County Prosecutor Ron O'Brien as "the poster child for the death penalty."

Murder of Charles Dials
On April 2, 1997, Campbell, feigning paralysis and thus in a wheelchair, was transported to court on an aggravated robbery charge. Upon arrival, he overpowered the sheriff's deputy responsible for transporting him, stole her gun, and fled the courthouse loading dock.  Campbell then carjacked 18-year-old Charles Dials, forcing him to drive for three hours. During that time, several mentions of the pursuit of Campbell by police were made over the radio, prompting Dials to ask Campbell if the person being pursued was him. After three hours, Campbell demanded that Dials get on the floor of his truck. Dials refused, prompting Campbell to shoot him twice, killing him. Campbell fled the vehicle before being caught by police shortly after.

Legal proceedings and aborted execution
Campbell was convicted of the aggravated robbery charge for which he was initially in court on October 7, 1997, six months after the death of Dials. He was convicted of Dials' murder and sentenced to death on April 10, 1998, just over a year after the killing.

In an order published by Ohio Governor John Kasich on May 1, 2017, Campbell's execution was rescheduled from September 13, 2017, to November 15, 2017, at the prescribed execution time of 10am EST. His clemency hearing was scheduled for October 12, 2017. The parole board returned a unanimous vote against clemency on October 20, 2017.

After being sent to the execution room on the morning of November 15, 2017, Campbell's execution was called off due to the nature of his health problems preventing the lethal injection from occurring. Executioners were unable to successfully find a vein in which to insert the IV which would contain the lethal drugs. His execution was rescheduled for June 5, 2019.

Death
On March 3, 2018, Franklin County prosecutor Ron O'Brien announced that Campbell had died of natural causes. He was 69 years old, and had cancer, lung disease, asthma, and heart problems.

See also
 Capital punishment in Ohio

References

1948 births
2018 deaths
1997 murders in the United States
Place of birth missing
Execution survivors
American people convicted of murder
People convicted of murder by Ohio
Prisoners sentenced to death by Ohio
Prisoners who died in Ohio detention